Uncharted may refer to:

Uncharted, an action-adventure video game series, and media franchise
Uncharted: Drake's Fortune, the first game in the series
Uncharted 2: Among Thieves, the second game in the series
Uncharted 3: Drake's Deception, the third game in the series
Uncharted 4: A Thief's End, the fourth game in the series
Uncharted: Golden Abyss
Uncharted: Fight for Fortune
Uncharted: The Lost Legacy
Uncharted Live Action Fan Film, a 2018 short film starring Nathan Fillion
Uncharted (film), a 2022 action-adventure film based on the video game series
"Uncharted" (song), a song by Sara Bareilles
Uncharted (album), the sixth studio album by The Piano Guys
Gordon Ramsay: Uncharted, a travel and food television series starring celebrity chef Gordon Ramsay

See also

Uncharted Channels, 1920 American silent drama film directed by Henry King
 Chart (disambiguation)